Amirabad Kaftar (also Romanized as Amīrābād Kāftar; also known as Amīrābād) is a village in Khonjesht Rural District, in the Central District of Eqlid County, Fars Province, Iran. At the 2006 census, its population was 1,368, in 281 families.

References 

Populated places in Eqlid County